Margot Irene Rufus Isaacs, Marchioness of Reading (née Duke; 11 January 1919 – 19 April 2015) was a British aristocrat and campaigner.

Early life
Margot was one of three daughters of Percival Augustus Duke and Violet Mappin, and was the half-sister of Sir Charles Mappin, Violet's son by her first marriage into the Mappin & Webb family.

Margot attended Benenden school and became a society beauty, and the face of Pond's face cream.

Marriage and family
In 1940, Margot married Michael, Viscount Erleigh, later the 3rd Marquess of Reading.

They had four children:
 Simon Isaacs, 4th Marquess of Reading
 Lady Jacqueline Rufus Isaacs
 Lord Antony Rufus Isaacs, a film producer 
 Lord Alexander Rufus Isaacs, a lawyer.

The family lived at Staplefield Grange, Staplefield Green, near Haywards Heath, Sussex.

Personal interests
Margot was one of the first women to hold a pilot's licence, and also competed in the 1952 Round Britain car rally. 
She wrote an historical novel Anne of the Sealed Knot about her civil war ancestor Anne Duke.

She took an outspoken position on social issues, writing to the Spectator in support of English football hooligans, and considered a political career as a Conservative. She was a keen member of the Mid Surrey Drag Hunt and later a campaigner for animal rights, particularly camels (through the Wild Camel Protection Foundation) and bears.

Later life
The Marchioness retired to Glebe Farm House, Cornwell, near Chipping Norton in Oxfordshire. She died on 19 April 2015, and her funeral was held at St Mary's Church, Chipping Norton.

Footnotes

References

1919 births
2015 deaths
People educated at Benenden School
British marchionesses
British aviators
British women aviators